A move-up home is a real estate term used to describe a larger and/or more expensive home that a person moves into from a smaller home. 

It is implied that as repeat buyers, the customer is more familiar with the real estate process than a first time buyer. 

In 2012, CNBC highlighted the challenges facing move-up home buyers when they owed more on their current homes than they were worth.

Move-up home purchases increase when interest rates are low.

See also
 Property ladder
 Downsizing (property)

References

Real estate terminology
Neologisms articles with topics of unclear notability
Neologisms